Staßfurt (Stassfurt) is a town in the Salzlandkreis district, in Saxony-Anhalt, Germany. Pop. (2005) 23,538.

It was one of the chief seats of the German salt-producing industry. It is still surrounded in part by the ruins of its ancient walls, but, with the exception of the parish church of St. John (15th century), there are no buildings worthy of special notice.

History
The first mention of the place was in connection with the village of Alt-Staßfurt in 806, in an invitation by Emperor Charlemagne to the Abbot Fulrad of St. Quentin to hold an army meeting at Starasfurt on the Bode River. The interpretation of the name is most likely from a composition of the Old Slavic word for old (staraja) with the Old High German word for river-crossing (furt).

The importance of Staßfurt in the Middle Ages was due to its location. Here, the old trading and salt road led from Lüneburg coming to Halle. The village Alt-Staßfurt north of the Bode was temporally and spiritually under the Archbishop of Magdeburg. In the 11th century, a castle was built south of the Bode. By 1180, the city law was extended to settlement areas south of the Bode within the defensive walls. Until 1277, Staßfurt and its castle was in the possession of the Anhalt Counts. Afterward, the brother Dukes of Saxony, John I and Albrecht II, held such a huge banquet celebrating their knighthoods that they to settle the debt of 6,000 silver marks by pledging Staßfurt to Archbishop Conrad II of Magdeburg on 8 July 1276.

In the Peace of Westphalia of 1648, Staßfurt shared the fate of Magdeburg and was awarded to Brandenburg, but only on the death of the Duke of Saxe-Weissenfels, who had been promised the territory in the Peace of Prague in 1635. As of 1680, Staßfurt was  a so-called Immediate City directly subordinated to the Duchy of Magdeburg and lay until 1807 in the Holzkreis region. After this, it was temporarily within a canton of the Kingdom of Westphalia. From 1815, Staßfurt was incorporated into the administrative district of Magdeburg in the Province of Saxony, and remained so until the dissolution of the Prussian state in 1947.

During the Second World War, a small satellite camp of Buchenwald called Staßfurt I / Neustaßfurt (alias deer) was built on 13 September 1944, situated between the villages of Löderburg-Lust and Atzendorf in which 459 prisoners, mostly from France, at the underground relocation of Ernst Heinkel AG had to work together with Polish concentration camp prisoners in extremely poor conditions. Of those, between 300 and 380 lost their lives. Another external camp existed from December 28, 1944 in the village of Leopoldshall. Both camps were evacuated on April 11, 1945 with a death march. The atomic bomb Little Boy, detonated over Hiroshima on 6 August 1945, contained 64 kilograms of uranium. At least part of the uranium allegedly came from the approximately 1,100 tons of uranium ore and uranium oxide, which had been secured by U.S. forces in Staßfurt in the second half of April 1945.

From 1952 to 1994, Staßfurt was county seat of the district of Staßfurt and later government district Magdeburg. With the regional reform in 1994, the new county of Aschersleben-Staßfurt was formed by the merger of the districts Aschersleben and Staßfurt. In the course of the district reform in 2007, Staßfurt was transferred to the newly formed Salzlandkreis.

The militant group SWAPO sent children from war-torn areas of South West Africa to Staßfurt for education and training in the German Democratic Republic during the independence struggle in the 1980s. Thus, at the beginning of 1990, 291 such children were at the school of friendship in Staßfurt. In August 1990, they were returned to the now independent Namibia.

Local divisions
Staßfurt is divided into the following localities (with postal codes):

  Altstaßfurt (39418)
  Atzendorf (39443)
  Athensleben (39446)
  Brumby (39443)
  Förderstedt (39443)
  Glöthe (39443)
  Hohenerxleben (39443)
  Leopoldshall (39418)
  Löbnitz (39443)
  Löderburg (39446)
  Lust (39446)
  Neu Staßfurt (39418)
  Neundorf (39418)
  Rathmannsdorf (39418)
  Rothenförde (39446)
  Staßfurt (Altstadt) (39418)
  Staßfurt-Nord (39418)
  Üllnitz (39443)

Staßfurt has the following Ortschaften or municipal divisions: Athensleben, Förderstedt, Hohenerxleben, Löderburg, Neundorf and Rathmannsdorf.

The lost hamlets of Atzendorf
Around the village of Atzendorf are several lost hamlets, reputedly destroyed together with Atzendorf and many other villages of Staßfurt on 29 August 1635 by Imperialist troops. Although the ruined hamlets of Eikendorfer Kock, Eimecke, Kötlingen, Luxdorf, and Stieritz appeared on older maps, today there is only tilled farmland. The old road to the nearby town of Borne bei Staßfurt was demolished but traces of its route are still visible in the lay of the land.

Salt production
Although saline springs are mentioned here as early as the 13th century, the first attempt to bore for salt was not made until 1839, while the systematic exploitation of the salt-beds, to which the town is indebted for its prosperity, dates only from 1856. The shafts reached deposits of salt at a depth of 850 ft. (190 m); but the finer and purer layers lie more than 100 ft. (31 m) below the surface. The rock-salt is excavated by blasting. Besides the rock-salt, the deposits of Stassfurt yield a considerable quantity of deliquescent salts and other saline products, which have encouraged the foundation of numerous chemical factories in the town and in the neighboring village of Leopoldshall (currently part of Staßfurt). The rock-salt works are mainly government property, while the chemical factories are in private hands. The town is also home to Staßfurt Museum shed, which houses many preserved steam locomotives.

Stassfurt potash deposit

The Staßfurt potash deposit, a part of the same evaporite sequence that hosts the salt mines, is notable historically as the site of the earliest large-scale mining of potash for fertilizer, beginning in 1861.

Environmental Issues

The discharge of wastewater by the CIECH Soda Germany GmbH & Co. KG into the Bode has been frequently criticized as severely damaging the ecosystem of the river by Environmentalist Organisations. The high amounts of ammonia and chloride in the wastewater have led to high fish mortality, especially in the summer, when water levels are low and water temperature is high. The state administration office of Saxony-Anhalt has extended the permit for CIECH Soda to discharge wastewater in October 2022. The required reductions in ammonia and chloride emissions by the company have been criticized as insufficient by BUND (Friends of the Earth Germany), the IG Bode-Lachs e.V. and the Green Party.

Notable people

 Waltraud Dietsch (born 1950), athlete
 Hermann Volrath Hilprecht (born 1859), archaeologist and assyriologist
 Eberhard Köllner (born 1939), Backup for Sigmund Jähn, research cosmonaut of the GDR
 Günther Noll (born 1927), music educator
 Wilhelm Steinkopf (1879–1949), German chemist
 Lutz Graf Schwerin von Krosigk (1887–1977), Minister of Finance of Germany from 1932 to 1945 and Leading Minister of the German Reich (Chancellor) in May 1945
 Karl Wilhelm von Willisen (1790–1879), Prussian general
 Andreas Wecker (born 1970), German gymnast

References

Salzlandkreis